Communities in the United States with a Hispanic-majority population as of the 2010 Census are primarily found in the Southwestern United States and in large metropolitan areas elsewhere in the country. The community with the highest percentage of Hispanic residents (among communities with over 100,000 people) is the unincorporated community of East Los Angeles, California, whose population was 97.1% Hispanic. Among incorporated localities of over 100,000 people, the city of Laredo, Texas has the highest percentage of Hispanic residents at 95.6%.

San Antonio, Texas is the largest Hispanic-majority city in the United States, with 807,000 Hispanics making up 61.2% of its population. New York City has the most Hispanic residents, although it is not Hispanic-majority and as such, is defined as a plurality.

Arizona

Places with between 25,000 and 100,000 people
Avondale (50.3%)
Drexel Heights (70.6%)
San Luis (98.7%)
Yuma (54.8%)

Places with between 10,000 and 25,000 people
Douglas (82.6%)
Eloy (58.0%)
Nogales (95.0%)
Rio Rico (formerly Rio Rico Northeast, Rio Rico Northwest, Rio Rico Southeast, and Rio Rico Southwest) (85.3%)
Somerton (95.2%)

Places with fewer than 10,000 people
Aguila (69.4%)
Arivaca Junction (67.6%)
Ash Fork (51.4%)
Avenue B and C (74.7%)
Aztec (91.5%)
Beyerville (89.8%)
Clifton (60.1%)
Dateland (59.4%)
Donovan Estates (93.4%)
Drexel-Alvernon (58.1%)
Drysdale (90.8%)
Dudleyville (63.4%)
El Prado Estates (84.5%)
Elfrida (54.2%)
Gadsden (97.1%)
Gila Bend (65.4%)
Guadalupe (62.2%)
Hayden (84.4%)
Kino Springs (62.5%)
Littletown (69.5%)
Mammoth (69.7%)
Miami (56.0%)
Morenci (53.1%)
Naco (83.9%)
Orange Grove Mobile Manor (98.8%)
Padre Ranchitos (78.4%)
Picacho (62.4%)
Pirtleville (95.3%)
Poston (55.4%)
Rancho Mesa Verde (98.1%)
San Jose (65.4%)
Solomon (75.8%)
South Tucson (78.5%)
Stanfield (66.1%)
Summit (80.3%)
Superior (68.5%)
Tacna (58.0%)
Theba (95.6%)
Tolleson (80.1%)
Tumacacori-Carmen (52.7%)
Valencia West (65.1%)
Wall Lane (83.1%)
Wenden (55.2%)
Winkelman (82.4%)
Willcox (50.1%)

Arkansas

Places with fewer than 10,000 people
De Queen (53.5%)
Danville (52.6%)
Wickes (52.1%)

California
See List of California communities with Hispanic majority populations in the 2010 census

Colorado

Places with between 10,000 and 25,000 people
Berkley (55.7%)
Sherrelwood (58.9%)
Welby (54.7%)

Places with fewer than 10,000 people
Alamosa (53.2%)
Alamosa East (54.1%)
Antonito (85.1%)
Avondale (59.8%)
Blanca (60.8%)
Cattle Creek (65.4%)
Capulin (83.0%)
Center (87.4%)
Conejos (82.8%)
Crowley (54.0%)
Del Norte (56.3%)
Derby (64.2%)
Dotsero (81.4%)
Fort Garland (85.0%)
Fort Lupton (55.0%)
Garden City (66.2%)
Gilcrest (55.5%)
Granada (70.6%)
Jansen (58.0%)
La Jara (62.3%)
Log Lane Village (50.1%)
Lynn (66.7%)
Monte Vista (61.3%)
Olathe (50.0%)
Rocky Ford (59.1%)
Romeo (79.5%)
Salt Creek (86.0%)
San Acacio (62.5%)
San Luis (84.3%)
Starkville (72.9%)
Trinidad (50.0%)
Twin Lakes (Adams County) (60.7%)
Walsenburg (56.0%)
Weston (72.7%)
Valdez (61.7%)

Connecticut 
The Hill (06519 zipcode) - 50.5% Hispanic

Florida

Places with over 100,000 people
 Hialeah (94.7%)
 Miami (70.0%)

Places with between 25,000 and 100,000 people
Buenaventura Lakes (69.6%)
Coral Gables (53.6%)
Country Club (78.8%)
Cutler Bay (54.5%)
Doral (79.5%)
Egypt Lake-Leto (60.0%)
Fontainebleau (91.6%)
Homestead (62.9%)
Kendale Lakes (86.5%)
Kendall West (88.3%)
Kendall (63.7%)
Kissimmee (58.9%)
Meadow Woods (67.2%)
Miami Beach (53.0%)
Miami Lakes (81.1%)
Poinciana (51.2%)
Richmond West (78.5%)
South Miami Heights (68.0%)
Tamiami (92.7%)
The Hammocks (76.9%)
University Park (85.0%)
West Little River (50.6%)
Westchester (91.1%)

Places with between 10,000 and 25,000 people
Azalea Park (59.0%)
Coral Terrace (88.6%)
Country Walk (70.2%)
Glenvar Heights (66.5%)
Golden Gate (58.5%)
Hialeah Gardens (94.9%)
Immokalee (75.6%)
Key Biscayne (61.6%)
Leisure City (74.9%)
Miami Springs (71.2%)
Olympia Heights (85.8%)
Palm Springs (50.6%)
Princeton (60.9%)
Sunset (80.3%)
Sweetwater (95.5%)
The Crossings (69.4%)
Three Lakes (65.4%)
Westwood Lakes (86.0%)

Places with fewer than 10,000 people
 Acacia Villas (Palm Beach County CDP)(63.2%)
Bowling Green (58.4%)
Brewster (100.0%)
Broadview Park (59.6%)
Dade City North (63.0%)
Dover (67.9%)
Fellsmere (81.1%)
Gun Club Estates (62.6%)
Harlem Heights (70.2%)
Indiantown (64.6%)
Islandia (88.9%)
Kenwood Estates (Palm Beach County CDP) (62.3%)
 Lakewood Gardens (Palm Beach County CDP) (62.3%)
Medley (92.2%)
Montura (Montura Ranch Estates) (69.1%)
Naples Manor (71.9%)
Naranja (51.6%)
North Bay Village (58.0%)
Palm Springs North (77.7%)
Pierson (54.1%)
 Pine Air (Palm Beach County CDP)(61.8%)
Pine Manor (60.2%)
Port LaBelle (53.4%)
Sky Lake (52.1%)
Southeast Arcadia (56.7%)
Tice (62.2%)
Virginia Gardens (77.3%)
West Miami (90.2%)
Wahneta (64.7%)
Wimauma (73.4%)
Zolfo Springs (64.4%)

Georgia

Places with fewer than 10,000 people
Chamblee (58.5%)
Fair Oaks (52.7%)
Lakeview Estates (85.6%)
Lumpkin (51.1%)

Places between 10,000 and 25,000 people 

 Dalton (50.85%)

Idaho

Places with fewer than 10,000 people
Aberdeen (54.1%)
Minidoka (76.8%)
Roberts (52.4%)
Wilder (75.9%)

Illinois

Places with between 25,000 and 100,000 people
Berwyn (59.4%)
Carpentersville (50.1%)
Cicero (86.6%)
Melrose Park (69.6%)
Waukegan (53.4%)
West Chicago (51.1%)

Places with between 10,000 and 25,000 people
Northlake (52.9%)
Summit (63.7%)

Places with fewer than 10,000 people
DePue (54.7%)
Fairmont City (71.4%)
Highwood (56.9%)
Park City (65.2%)
Posen (53.0%)
Stickney (50.9%)
Stone Park (88.1%)

Indiana

Places with between 25,000 and 100,000 people
East Chicago (50.9%)

Places with fewer than 10,000 people
Ligonier (51.5%)

Iowa

Places with fewer than 10,000 people
Conesville (63.0%)
West Liberty (52.2%)

Kansas

Places with between 25,000 and 100,000 people
Dodge City (57.5%)

Places with between 10,000 and 25,000 people
Liberal (58.7%)

Places with fewer than 10,000 people
Wilroads Gardens (62.4%)

Maryland

Places with between 10,000 and 25,000 people
East Riverdale (53.3%)
Langley Park (76.6%)

Places with fewer than 10,000 people
Riverdale Park (50.0%)

Massachusetts

Places with between 25,000 and 100,000 people
Chelsea (62.1%)
Lawrence (73.8%)

Places where Hispanics outnumber any specific non-Hispanic racial group
Holyoke (48.4%)

Missouri

Places with fewer than 10,000 people
Southwest City (50.8%)

Nebraska

Places with between 10,000 and 25,000 people
Lexington (60.4%)

Places with fewer than 10,000 people
Schuyler (65.4%)

Nevada

Places with fewer than 10,000 people
Jackpot (55.6%)
West Wendover (61.7%)

Places where Hispanics outnumber any specific non-Hispanic racial group
Sunrise Manor, Nevada - 48.5%
Winchester, Nevada - 44.6%

New Jersey

Places with over 100,000 people
Elizabeth (59.5%)
Paterson (57.6%)

Places with between 25,000 and 100,000 people
North Bergen (68.4%)
Passaic (71.0%)
Perth Amboy (78.1%)
Union City (84.7%)
West New York (78.1%)

Places with between 10,000 and 25,000 people
Dover (69.4%)
Fairview (54.6%)
Guttenberg (64.8%)

Places with fewer than 10,000 people
East Newark (61.4%)
Prospect Park (52.1%)
Victory Gardens (63.0%)

New Mexico
See List of New Mexico communities with Hispanic majority populations in the 2000 census

New York

Places with over 100,000 people
The Bronx (53.5%)

Places with between 25,000 and 100,000 people
Brentwood (61.0%)
Central Islip (52.1%)

Places with 10,000 to 25,000 people
Haverstraw (54.1%)
North Bay Shore (59.4%)
Port Chester(59.4%)

Places with fewer than 10,000 people
Brewster (56.0%)
Sleepy Hollow (51.0%)

North Carolina

Places with fewer than 10,000 people
Robbins (50.3%)

Oklahoma

Places with between 10,000 and 25,000 people
Guymon (51.5%)

Places with fewer than 10,000 people
Optima (76.1%)  	
Ringwood (50.3%)

Oregon

Places with between 10,000 and 25,000 people
Cornelius (50.1%)
Woodburn (58.9%)

Places with fewer than 10,000 people
Biggs Junction (50.0%)
Boardman (61.7%)
Gervais (67.1%)
Labish Village (67.0%)
Odell (63.5%)
Malin (57.8%)
Nyssa (60.5%)

Pennsylvania

Places with over 100,000 people
Allentown (52.5%)

Places with between 25,000 and 100,000 people
Reading (58.2%)

Places with fewer than 10,000 people
Avondale (59.0%)
Toughkenamon (58.0%)

Rhode Island

Places with between 10,000 and 25,000 people
Central Falls (60.3%)

Texas
See List of Texas communities with Hispanic majority populations in the 2000 census

Utah

Places with fewer than 10,000 people
Beryl Junction (51.8%)
Hideout (77.0%)
Wendover (68.3%)

Washington

Places with between 25,000 and 100,000 people
Pasco (55.7%)

Places with between 10,000 and 25,000 people
Grandview (79.7%)
Sunnyside (82.2%)

Places with fewer than 10,000 people
Basin City (81.7%)
Brewster (73.0%)
Bridgeport (76.7%)
Buena (81.3%)
Cowiche (67.8%)
Chelan Falls (51.4%)
Desert Aire (51.3%)
George (75.0%)
Granger (88.2%)
Harrah (55.4%)
Mabton (91.9%)
Mattawa (95.7%)
Mesa (75.3%)
Othello (74.7%)
Outlook (83.6%)
Quincy (74.3%)
Rock Island (51.4%)
Roosevelt (51.9%)
Royal City (88.7%)
South Wenatchee (62.7%)
Tieton (64.4%)
Toppenish (82.6%)
Wapato (84.2%)
Warden (77.1%)

Wisconsin

Places with fewer than 10,000 people
Arcadia (63.6%)
Curtiss (51.9%)

See also 
 List of U.S. cities with large Hispanic populations
 List of U.S. communities with Hispanic-majority populations in the 2000 census
 List of U.S. counties with Hispanic- or Latino-majority populations
List of U.S. communities with African-American majority populations in 2010
 List of U.S. communities with Asian-American majority populations
 List of U.S. communities with Native-American majority populations

References

Hispanic and Latino demographics in the United States
Hispanic